Klaver, meaning clover, is a Dutch surname. People with this name include:

Jesse Klaver (born 1986), Dutch politician
Karel Klaver (born 1978), Dutch field hockey player
Lieke Klaver (born 1998), Dutch track athlete
Luite Klaver (1870–1960), Dutch painter
Melody Klaver (born 1990), Dutch actress

Dutch-language surnames